Eutropis resetarii is a species of skink, a lizard in the family Scincidae. The species is endemic to Sri Lanka.

Etymology
The specific name, resetarii, is in honor of American herpetologist Alan Resetar.

Description
E. resetarii has supranasals and prefrontals widely separated. Postnasals are absent. The prefrontals reach the lateral sides of the snout. Only the first supraocular is in contact with the frontal. There are six or seven supraciliaries, and the lower preocular is as large as the first loreal. The first and second pairs of chin shields are separated by a single scale. The digits are comparatively robust. The external ear opening is large. There are 14 to 15 subdigital lamellae located under the fourth digit of the pes.

Reproduction
The mode of reproduction of E. resetarii is unknown.

References

Eutropis
Reptiles described in 2020
Reptiles of Sri Lanka
Endemic fauna of Sri Lanka